Cysteinyldopa is a catecholamine.  Excessive cysteinyldopa in plasma and urine has been linked to malignant melanoma. Cysteinyldopa is found in large amounts in the plasma and urine of patients with malignant melanoma. It is therefore used in the diagnosis of melanoma and for the detection of postoperative metastases. Cysteinyldopa is believed to be formed by the rapid enzymatic hydrolysis of 5-S-glutathionedopa found in melanin-producing cells.

See also 

 L-DOPA
 D-DOPA

References 

Catecholamines
Human pathological metabolites
Sulfur amino acids